State Trunk Highway 146 (often called Highway 146, STH-146 or WIS 146) is a state highway in the U.S. state of Wisconsin. It runs north–south in central Wisconsin from Fall River to Cambria. It was designated in between 1923 and 1925.

Route description

Starting at WIS 16 northwest of Fall River, WIS 146 begins its journey northward. It then meanders northward to Cambria. In Cambria, WIS 146 turns north via Williams Street, west via Florence Street, and then north again via Madison Street. After leaving Cambria, it then meets WIS 33. At this point, the route ends there and continues as County Trunk Highways M (CTH-M).

History
The first iteration of WIS 146 was established in 1923 to connect Bellevue southeast of Green Bay to Kewaunee at the lake. WIS 146 was eventually removed and replaced by WIS 29 (former WIS 16) in 1926.

Wisconsin Highway 141 (WIS 141) was designated along WIS 146's current route between 1923 and 1925. It was renumbered to WIS 146 in 1926 to avoid duplicating a newly-established U.S. Highway with the same number in Wisconsin.

Major intersections

See also

References

External links

146
Transportation in Columbia County, Wisconsin